Lynn John Arnold (1864-1920), was an American bank president, publisher, lawyer, and a judge. In 1911 he was the publisher of the Knickerbocker Press.

References

1864 births
1920 deaths
American publishers (people)
Place of birth missing
19th-century American lawyers